Jerry Steele (March 10, 1939 – July 11, 2021) was an American basketball player and coach and college athletics administrator. He served as the head men's basketball coach at Guilford College in Greensboro, North Carolina from 1962 to 1970 and High Point University in High Point, North Carolina from 1972 to 2003, compiling a career college basketball coaching record of 609–486. Steele was also the head coach of the Carolina Cougars of the American Basketball Association (ABA) for half of one season, 1970–71, tallying a mark of 17–25.

Early life and playing career
A native of Elkin, North Carolina, he played basketball at Wake Forest University from 1958 to 1961 and in two of those years he was a member of the Atlantic Coast Conference All-Academic team. After graduating from Wake Forest, Steele earned his master's degree from University of North Carolina at Chapel Hill.

Coaching career

Guilford
Steele took over as the men's basketball coach at Guilford College in 1962. His first season with the Quakers, he finished with a 5–20 record. Steele then led the Quakers to two conference titles, four district championships, and four trips to the NAIA Tournament. During the 1969–70 season, the Quakers won 29 straight games, finishing 32–4 and fourth in the nation.

Carolina Cougars
In 1970 Steele joined the Carolina Cougars of the American Basketball Association (ABA) as an assistant coach under Bones McKinney. In November 1970, after the Cougars started the season with a record of 17–25, McKinney was dismissed and Steele was promoted to head coach. Steele's record for the remainder of the season matched that of McKinney: 17–25. The Cougars finished the 1970–71 season with an overall record of 34–50, placing sixth in the ABA's Eastern Division and missing the playoffs. After season concluded, Steele moved on to become director of player personnel for the Cougars and was replaced as head coach by Tom Meschery.

High Point
In 1972, Steele became the head coach at High Point University. Among his early players was current High Point head coach Tubby Smith.  Steele coached at High Point for 32 years, from 1972 to 2003. During his tenure, High Point won eight conference titles, made one appearance in the NAIA Men's Basketball Championships, and earned two trips to the NCAA Division II men's basketball tournament. His record at High Point was 457–412. He also served as athletic director at High Point for 21 years, from 1978 to 1999. Steele retired after the end of the 2002–03 season.

Personal life
Steele was elected to the NAIA Hall of Fame in 1987.  In 2002 Steele was inducted into the North
Carolina Sports Hall of Fame.  In 2005 Steele was inducted into the Guilford County, North Carolina Sports Hall of Fame. In 2007, the Steele Sports Center was opened on the campus of High Point University, named after the Panthers' prolific coach and his wife, Kitty Steele, who was also a coach at High Point. This facility houses locker rooms, offices and training facilities for 11 of High Point's 16 varsity sports. The men's and women's basketball teams are those excluded from this facility, due to the large amount of office space required for the two revenue-earning sports, as well as the former athletic administration's offices' proximity to the varsity basketball arena floor and locker rooms, which the basketball coaches moved into in April 2007.

He died on July 11, 2021.

Head coaching record

College

ABA

|-
| style="text-align:left;"|Carolina
| style="text-align:left;"|1970-71
|42||17||25||.405|| style="text-align:center;"|6th in Eastern||-||-||-||-
| style="text-align:center;"|
|- ! style="background:#FDE910;"
|- class="sortbottom"
| style="text-align:left;"|Career
| ||42||17||25||.405|| ||-||-||-||-

See also
 List of college men's basketball coaches with 600 wins

References
 North Carolina Sports Hall of Fame profile
 Remember the ABA Carolina Cougars page

1939 births
2021 deaths
American men's basketball coaches
American men's basketball players
Basketball coaches from North Carolina
Basketball players from North Carolina
Carolina Cougars coaches
Guilford Quakers men's basketball coaches
High Point Panthers athletic directors
High Point Panthers men's basketball coaches
Palestine national basketball team managers
People from Elkin, North Carolina
Wake Forest Demon Deacons men's basketball players